Ma Xiuyue (born May 21, 1991) is a Chinese curler from Harbin. He won a bronze medal at the 2015 Pacific-Asia Curling Championships and represented China at the 2022 Winter Olympics, skipping the men's curling team.

Career
Ma represented China twice at the World Junior Curling Championships in 2011 and 2012. On both occasions, his team finished with a 4–5 record. Also in 2011 and 2012, Ma won back-to-back Pacific-Asia Junior Curling Championships.

Ma skipped the Chinese team at the 2013 Winter Universiade. Representing the Harbin Institute of Physical Education, his team finished in ninth with a 2–7 record.

In 2015, Ma was the alternate on the Chinese team skipped by Zang Jialiang at the 2015 Pacific-Asia Curling Championships. The team finished the round robin in second place with a 6–1 record before dropping their semifinal match to South Korea's Kim Soo-hyuk. They rebounded against New Zealand's Peter de Boer to claim the bronze medal. Ma next represented China internationally at the third leg of the Curling World Cup event. There, he skipped his team of Ling Zhi, Cheng Kuo and Wang Jingyuan to a 1–5 record.

After taking a few seasons off, Ma returned to curling when he was appointed as skip of the Chinese men's team for the 2022 Winter Olympics, held in Beijing. His team consisted of Zou Qiang, Wang Zhiyu, Xu Jingtao and Jiang Dongxu. Despite not playing a single international competition before the Games, the team fared quite well, finishing the round robin with a 4–5 record. This included defeating higher-seeded teams such as Switzerland's Peter de Cruz, Norway's Steffen Walstad, and Italy's Joël Retornaz. Ultimately, they finished in a four-way tie for fifth place; however, their head to head wins over Switzerland and Norway placed them alone in fifth place at the end of the competition.

Teams

References

External links

1991 births
Living people
Sportspeople from Harbin
Chinese male curlers
Curlers at the 2022 Winter Olympics
Olympic curlers of China